Chia Kuo-liang (born 13 December 1950) is a Taiwanese alpine skier. He competed in two events at the 1972 Winter Olympics.

References

1950 births
Living people
Taiwanese male alpine skiers
Olympic alpine skiers of Taiwan
Alpine skiers at the 1972 Winter Olympics
Place of birth missing (living people)